SCOPE Art Show (SCOPE) is a contemporary art fair held annually in New York City, Miami Beach, and Basel. The art fairs, which focus on young galleries and emerging art, each include between 60 and 100 exhibitors.

History 
SCOPE was founded by artist and gallerist Alexis Hubshman. The first art fair was held at New York’s Gershwin Hotel. SCOPE began as an international exhibition of 28 galleries, curators, and art organizations. Each exhibitor featured one emerging artist.

In 2004, SCOPE New York expanded to feature 65 international exhibitors and included the new Culture on the Verge Party to open the fair. In addition to the continuing Miami, New York, and Los Angeles fairs, SCOPE added a fair in London at the Melia White House in Regents Park in 2004. In 2005, SCOPE included the Hamptons and Venice in its program. In 2007, SCOPE Basel was held for the first time at E-Halle.

The Collector Mentorship Auction, created by artist Lilah Freedland for Scope, allowed young collectors to further their knowledge of the art field by bidding on mentorship hours with established collectors. The silent auction took place at Fairs in Miami, New York, and The Hamptons. Young art collectors from the Whitney Contemporaries, the Guggenheim Museum’s Young Collectors Council, the Core Club, and the Soho House, among others, bid for the opportunity to work with more experienced collectors such as Beth Rudin DeWoody, Warhol collaborator Bob Colacello, Enrique Norten, Jed Walentas, and Brooklyn Museum director Arnold Lehman.

SCOPE Hamptons 2008 includes a Green Lecture/Panel Discussion featuring architects and representatives from both Verdant Magazine and the Parrish Art Museum.

See also
Perpetual Art Machine
Art Basel

References

External links 
SCOPE Art

Art exhibitions in the United States